The Lukeville, Arizona Port of Entry was established by Executive Order in 1949.  It has primarily been a port of entry for passenger vehicles and pedestrians. 

It connects Mexican Federal Highway 8 in Sonoyta, Sonora, with Arizona State Route 85, in Lukeville, Arizona. Modifications made using funding from the Federal Highway Administration and Mexican businesses in 2011 facilitate the inspection of trucks and improve general throughput.  Much of the traffic using this crossing is people traveling to the popular beach town of Puerto Peñasco, Sonora.

See also
 List of Mexico–United States border crossings
 List of Canada–United States border crossings

References

Buildings and structures in Pima County, Arizona
Mexico–United States border crossings